Cesilio de los Santos (born 12 February 1965) is a retired Uruguayan football defender.

He has been capped for Uruguay. He made his debut in a friendly match against Mexico (1-1 draw) on November 20, 1991 in Veracruz.

Honours

Club 
América
 Primera División: 1988–89
 Campeón de Campeones: 1989
 CONCACAF Champions' Cup: 1990, 1992
 Copa Interamericana: 1990

References

External links

1965 births
Living people
People from Rivera Department
Uruguayan footballers
Uruguayan expatriate footballers
Uruguay international footballers
1993 Copa América players
Uruguayan Primera División players
Liga MX players
C.A. Bella Vista players
Club América footballers
Tigres UANL footballers
Club Puebla players
Club Nacional de Football players
Expatriate footballers in Mexico
Association football defenders